Rouge et Noir is French for "red and black" and may refer to:

 Rouge et Noir, a solitaire (patience) card game
 Rouge et Noir, a gambling game also known as Trente et Quarante
 Le rouge et le noir, a French film known in English as The Red and the Black
 Rouge et Noir, a cheese brand of the Marin French Cheese Company
 The Ottawa Redblacks of the Canadian Football League, whose Francophone nickname is Le Rouge et Noir.